Howard Lee Chuan How (born 3 January 1983) is a Malaysian politician who has served as the Member of Parliament (MP) for Ipoh Timor since November 2022. He served as Member of the Perak State Executive Council (EXCO) in the Pakatan Harapan (PH) state administration under former Menteri Besar Ahmad Faizal Azumu from May 2018 to the collapse of the PH state administration in March 2020 and Member of the Perak State Legislative Assembly (MLA) for Pasir Pinji from May 2013 to November 2022. He is a member of the Democratic Action Party (DAP), a component party of the PH opposition coalition. In DAP, he served as Youth Chief or known as Chief of the DAP youth wing namely Democratic Action Party Socialist Youth (DAPSY) from December 2018 to March 2022 while in PH, he served as its 4th Youth Chief from September 2021 to July 2022 and previously served as its Deputy Youth Chief.  He was the 24th President of International Union of Socialist Youth (IUSY).

Early life 
Lee was born in Ipoh in 1983 and was schooled at SRJK (C) Poi Lam until primary 6. He then continued his secondary education at Great Yarmouth High School & Technology College, United Kingdom, and completed a BTEC National Diploma in Science at Great Yarmouth FE College in the East of England.

Lee has been involved in politics & activism as early as the age of 16 when he was elected Vice president of the local Student Union in the East of England. HE was the general manager of a Pizza Hut in Norwich UK Lee and a few of his counterparts founded a civil and society movement that revitalized a previously neglected section of Norwich City, into a heritage attraction and booming retail district. Active in local politics throughout his working life, he also contested as a candidate under the UK Liberal Democrats at a City Council by election.

Lee returned to Malaysia at the end of 2007 saw the start of his involvement with DAP Malaysia. He was appointed campaign manager for the then first term candidate for the state assembly constituency of Canning, Sdr Wong Kah Woh.

Since then, Lee has continued to play various key roles  in DAP Malaysia and the then Malaysian main opposition coalition Pakatan Rakyat. As State Secretary of DAPSY Perak, he works throughout the state, speaking in rural areas, as well as regularly working the Urban ceramah (rally) circuit. Lee also heads PROSPECT, an opposition linked, independently funded policy thinktank charged with the task of crafting policies for Perak state political leaders through public and stakeholder engagement. Lee is also the director of the Pakatan Rakyat Alternative Budget Task-force, and the leader of the Pakatan Rakyat Perak Manifesto Team.

Political career

United Kingdom
In 2010, Lee contested in United Kingdom for the Norwich City Council by-election on a Liberal Democrats ticket but lost to the Labour Party candidate by 247 majority.

Malaysia
During the 13th General Elections of Malaysia, Lee won the Perak State Legislative Assembly constituency of Pasir Pinji polling 17,896 votes defeating Barisan National candidate with 13,632 majority.

In 2015, he was elected as one of the DAPSY central committee member and also Perak DAPSY Chief.

In 2016, Lee was also elected as the new President of IUSY, the largest political youth organisation in the world during the congress in Albania. He is the first Southeast Asian to be elected to the position, and this is the highest international position that DAPSY has achieved. He was also appointed into the Board of the Progressive Alliance, the highest forum of the global organisation in his capacity as the IUSY President. He is also standing member of SocDem Asia's Steering Committee, representing DAP at the regional level. He remains as instrumental player in global and regional progressive political party circles.

In 2017, Lee's loyalty towards Malaysia was questioned when it was revealed that he tried to obtain British naturalisation in 2002 and settlement visa in 2007 but were denied consecutively for both. He also had set up an online petition and a video plea seeking support to allow him to return to the United Kingdom upon coming back to Malaysia.

During the 14th General Elections of Malaysia, Lee retained his state constituency of Pasir Pinji seat polling 23,282 votes, defeating Barisan Nasional candidate with 20,856 majority.

In May 2018, Lee was elected as one of the Perak State Executive Council. His current portfolio that he holds are Youth and Sports Development (PPBS). He is also a committee in Perak Investment Council of Advisory.

In December 2018, Lee won the National DAPSY Chief Election by defeating his opponent, Chow Hu Yui with 186 to 166 votes. Howard Lee succeeds Ipoh Timur MP, Wong Kah Woh. Subsequently, he was appointed as Deputy Chief for Pakatan Harapan Youth.

Election results

References

External links 
 

1983 births
Living people
People from Perak
Malaysian people of Chinese descent
Democratic Action Party (Malaysia) politicians
Members of the Dewan Rakyat
Members of the 15th Malaysian Parliament
Members of the Perak State Legislative Assembly